Chittagong-15 is a constituency represented in the Jatiya Sangsad (National Parliament) of Bangladesh since 2014 by Abu Reza Muhammad Nezamuddin of the Awami League.

Boundaries 
The constituency encompasses Lohagara Upazila and all but six union parishads of Satkania Upazila: Bazlia, Dharmapur, Kalais, Keochia, Khagaria, and Puranagar.

History 
The constituency was created for the first general elections in newly independent Bangladesh, held in 1973.

Ahead of the 2014 general election, the Election Commission renumbered the seat for Sandwip Upazila from Chittagong-16 to Chittagong-3, bumping up by one the suffix of the former constituency of that name and the higher numbered constituencies in the district. Thus Chittagong-15 covers the area previously covered by Chittagong-14. Previously Chittagong-15 encompassed Banshkhali Upazila.

Members of Parliament

Elections

Elections in the 2010s

Elections in the 2000s

Elections in the 1990s

References

External links
 

Parliamentary constituencies in Bangladesh
Chittagong District